Jesselton Hotel is a hotel located in the city of Kota Kinabalu, Sabah, Malaysia. It is the oldest and known as the first ever hotel to be built in the city.

History 
Following the devastation of Jesselton (present-day Kota Kinabalu) after the World War II, the British Colonial governor of Jesselton, Sir Herbert Ralph Hone encouraged British Hong Kong Chinese businessmen to invest and rebuild Jesselton town. The hotel was built at the 69 Bond Street (present-day Gaya Street) in 1954. The hotel was then sold to Sabah Chinese leader Khoo Siak Chew who then transferred the hotel management to Wong Tze Fatt, who is the founder of Southeast Asia Gardenia Bread brand. Under the management of Wong, the hotel undergoing a series of renovation.

Notable guests 
 Edwina Mountbatten; English heirs, visiting during her reception that was held by the British Governor Roland Turnbull.
 Muhammad Ali; American boxer, visiting after a match in Kuala Lumpur on his way to Manila.

References 

Buildings and structures in Kota Kinabalu
Hotel buildings completed in 1954
Hotels established in 1954